The following are lists of assets of the Canadian Broadcasting Corporation.

Television

Conventional television

CBC Television

Former affiliates 

1 - CHEK-TV carried an official secondary affiliation with CTV alongside CBC from 1963 until 1981.

Ici Radio-Canada Télé

Former affiliates 

Notes:
1 ) Also affiliated with the English CBC network, 1959-1968;
2 ) Also affiliated with the English CBC network, 1954-1957;
3 ) Also affiliated with the English CBC network, 1957-1962;
4 ) Affiliated with both CBC and Radio-Canada, 1956-1974; now TVA affiliate.
5 ) Affiliated with both CBC and Radio-Canada, 1956 until CBFOT (now CBLFT-3) established, which rebroadcasts CBLFT Toronto;

Specialty cable channels
CBC News Network
Documentary Channel
Ici ARTV
Ici Explora
Ici RDI
Le Consortium de télévision Québec Canada (joint venture with Télé-Québec, TFO and Association des producteurs de films et de télévision du Québec)
TV5 Québec Canada
Unis

Radio

Conventional radio

CBC Radio One 
CBC Radio One owned-and-operated stations:

Ici Radio-Canada Première 
Ici Radio-Canada Première owned-and-operated stations:
Charlottetown - CBAF-FM-15, 88.1 FM
Edmonton - CHFA-FM, 90.1 AM
Halifax - CBAF-FM-5, 92.3 FM
Matane - CBGA-FM, 102.1 FM
Moncton - CBAF-FM, 88.5 FM
Montreal - CBF-FM, 95.1 FM
Ottawa - CBOF-FM, 90.7 FM
Quebec City - CBV-FM, 106.3 FM
Regina - CBKF-FM 97.7 FM
Rimouski - CJBR-FM, 89.1 FM
Rouyn-Noranda - CHLM-FM, 90.7 FM
Saguenay - CBJ-FM, 93.7 FM
Sept-Îles - CBSI-FM, 98.1 FM
Sherbrooke - CBF-FM-10, 101.1 FM
Saint Boniface (Winnipeg) - CKSB-10-FM, 1050 AM, 90.5 FM
Sudbury - CBON-FM, 98.1 FM
Toronto - CJBC, 860 AM
Trois-Rivières - CBF-FM-8, 96.5 FM
Vancouver - CBUF-FM, 97.7 FM
Windsor - CBEF, 1550 AM

CBC Music and Ici Musique

Satellite radio
The CBC used to own a 40% stake in Sirius XM Canada until 2017.

CBC-owned Sirius radio stations:
 CBC Radio One — a simulcast of the radio network with local content replaced with national content
 CBC Radio 3 — a simulcast of the internet radio service
 Première Plus — a simulcast of the Première Chaîne radio network with local content replaced with national content
 Bande à part — a simulcast of the internet radio service
 Sports extra
 RCI Plus — a simulcast of the Radio Canada International radio broadcasting service

Other radio
 CBC Radio 3
 Espace Classique — French-language internet radio service that airs classical music
 Espace Jazz — French-language internet radio service that airs jazz
 Radio Canada International
 Weatheradio Canada

Online
 CBC.ca
 CBC Hamilton
 Radio-Canada.ca
 Ici TOU.TV
 CBC Corporate website
 All websites associated with the properties listed on this page

Film production
CBC Films is the film finance and production arm of the Canadian Broadcasting Corporation, focusing mostly on films by female, LGBT, indigenous, and diverse Canadian filmmakers. Its initiatives include funding, pre-buys, and acquisitions for CBC broadcast and streaming platforms.

Mobile Production
Video and Audio

Record Label
CBC Records

Facilities
CBC-owned buildings include:
CBC Regional Broadcast Centre Vancouver
Canadian Broadcasting Centre (Toronto)
Glenn Gould Studio
Maison Radio-Canada (Montreal)
The CBC Ottawa Production Centre is not owned by CBC, but rather leased from Morguard Investments.

Former CBC facilities and structures include:

 CBC Jarvis Street Tower (Toronto)
 CBC Museum (Toronto)
 CBC Tower (Mont-Carmel)
 CBC Radio Building (Halifax)
 Château Laurier (office space; Ottawa)
 Edward Drake Building (Ottawa)
 Hutchinson Building (Saskatoon)
 Victoria Building (Ottawa)

Services and platforms

References

Notes

External links
CBC Radio Canada Corporate Site

Canadian Broadcasting Corporation
Canadian Broadcasting Corporation
Canadian television-related lists